Dragan Gaćeša (born 12 October 1965) is a Serbian retired footballer who played as a full back.

Football career
Born in Novi Sad, SFR Yugoslavia, in his country, Gaćeša represented FK Vojvodina helping it win the Yugoslav championship in the 1988–89 season.

In summer of 1990, he moved to Portugal where he played for Uniao Madeira for 8 years.

External links
stats

1965 births
Living people
Footballers from Novi Sad
Yugoslav footballers
Serbian footballers
Association football midfielders
FK Vojvodina players
C.F. União players
Yugoslav First League players
Primeira Liga players
Serbian expatriate footballers
Expatriate footballers in Portugal